Ilya Igorevich Zubov (born February 14, 1987) is a Russian professional ice hockey player currently playing for Hc Tesla Orli Znojmo of the ICE Hockey League (ICEHL). He played two seasons in the American Hockey League (AHL) for the Binghamton Senators and ten games in the National Hockey League (NHL) for the Ottawa Senators.

Playing career
Zubov's past experience was playing centre for Salavat Yulaev Ufa, Spartak Moscow, and Atlant Moscow Oblast professional teams in the Russian Superleague (RSL). Zubov was acquired by the Ottawa Senators by drafting him 98th overall in the 2005 NHL Entry Draft. The pick had been acquired from the St. Louis Blues for Patrick Lalime.

Zubov publicly stated before the 2007-08 season that he would accept being sent to the Senators' AHL affiliate in Binghamton if he did not make the team in the 2007-08 season. This was expected and would provide the best chance at making the NHL team in the subsequent season given Ottawa GM Bryan Murray's insistence that he learn "North American hockey."  Zubov was assigned to Binghamton on October 1, 2007.

In his first NHL pre-season game, Zubov scored the first goal in a 4-0 victory over the Philadelphia Flyers. Zubov committed to refining his physical game to accommodate the more aggressive NHL style, and played the entire season in the AHL. While playing a primarily third and second line checking role, Zubov scored 15 goals and 22 assists for 37 points in 70 games. In this time, he learned to initiate and absorb heavy contact, and to engage in determined play down low. He, then, started working on the defensive side of his game. Residing in Ottawa, he worked with Senators strength and conditioning coach Randy Lee. Since the fall of 2007, Zubov gained over 20 lbs of muscle. Ilya had a great showing at the Senators Mini Development Camp in the summer of 2008, and hoped to crack the line-up in the 2008–09 season. Zubov played the majority of the season with Binghamton once again, but was called up for ten games to Ottawa and scored two assists for his first NHL points.

In the 2009–10 season, Zubov was again demoted to the Binghamton Senators from the Ottawa Senators's training camp. Disappointed with his demotion, on September 30, 2009, he demanded a trade to another organization. On October 7, he left Binghamton and was given permission by Ottawa to sign with a Russian team. His NHL rights were retained by Ottawa. On October 21, it was announced that Zubov would be loaned to his old team -Salavat Yulaev Ufa- for the season.

In 2009, Zubov signed with CSKA Moscow. Zubov would play four and a half seasons with CSKA before being transferred to Admiral Vladivostok in December 2013. On July 1, 2014, Zubov became a NHL free agent with his right's expired with the Senators, he opted to continue his career in the KHL.

Career statistics

Regular season and playoffs

International

References

External links

RussianProspects.com Ilya Zubov's Profile

1987 births
Admiral Vladivostok players
Amur Khabarovsk players
Atlant Moscow Oblast players
Avangard Omsk players
Binghamton Senators players
HC CSKA Moscow players
Living people
Orli Znojmo players
Ottawa Senators draft picks
Ottawa Senators players
Russian ice hockey centres
Salavat Yulaev Ufa players
HC Spartak Moscow players
Sportspeople from Chelyabinsk
Traktor Chelyabinsk players
Russian expatriate sportspeople in Canada
Russian expatriate sportspeople in the United States
Russian expatriate sportspeople in the United Arab Emirates
Russian expatriate sportspeople in the Czech Republic
Expatriate ice hockey players in the United Arab Emirates
Expatriate ice hockey players in the United States
Expatriate ice hockey players in the Czech Republic
Expatriate ice hockey players in Canada
Russian expatriate ice hockey people